The Four Just Men, also known as The Secret Four, is a 1939 British thriller film directed by Walter Forde and starring Hugh Sinclair, Griffith Jones, Edward Chapman and Frank Lawton. It is based on the 1905 novel The Four Just Men by Edgar Wallace. There was a previous silent film version in 1921. This version was produced by Ealing Studios, with sets designed by Wilfred Shingleton.

The Four Just Men was re-released in 1944 with an updated ending featuring newsreel of Winston Churchill and the Allied war effort as a fulfilment of the ideals of the Four. The adviser on the House of Commons of the United Kingdom scenes was Aneurin Bevan.

Premise
The Four Men are British World War I veterans who unite to work in secret against enemies of the country. They aren't above a spot of murder or sabotage to achieve their ends, but they consider themselves true patriots.

Cast

 Hugh Sinclair – Humphrey Mansfield
 Griffith Jones – James Brodie
 Francis L. Sullivan – Leon Poiccard
 Frank Lawton – Terry
 Anna Lee – Ann Lodge
 Alan Napier – Sir Hamar Ryman M.P.
 Basil Sydney – Frank Snell
 Lydia Sherwood – Myra Hastings
 Edward Chapman- B. J. Burrell
 Athole Stewart – Police Commissioner
 George Merritt – Inspector Falmouth
 Garry Marsh – Bill Grant
 Ellaline Terriss – Lady Willoughby
 Roland Pertwee – Mr Hastings
 Eliot Makeham – Simmons
 Frederick Piper – Pickpocket
 Henrietta Watson – Mrs Truscott
 Jon Pertwee – Rally campaigner
 Liam Gaffney – Taxi driver
 James Knight – Policeman Outside Parliament  
 Charles Paton – Platform Speaker 
 Percy Walsh – Prison Governor  
 Percy Parsons – American Broadcaster  
 Bryan Herbert – Taxi driver  
 Arthur Hambling – Constable Benham

Critical reception
The New York Times reviewer wrote, "Four Just Men, by Edgar Wallace, whatever it might have been, was probably not a work of literature, and therefore, on that charitable assumption, it is gently, rather than harshly, that one must deal with the British-made screen version, now on view at the Globe Theatre. Like all pictures seeping over from England nowadays, it is more than a little infected with the virus propagandistus, but, over and above that common-carrier failing, it is a model of sheer incredibility crossed with what (carrying out the charity idea) we might designate as espionage melodrama". According to a writer for the Radio Times decades later "it defiantly suggests that Britain could never fall under the sway of a dictator. But in all other respects it's a rollicking boys' own adventure, with some of the most fiendishly comic-book murders you will ever see... hugely entertaining sub-Hitchcockian antics".

References

Bibliography
 Low, Rachael. Filmmaking in 1930s Britain. George Allen & Unwin, 1985.
 Perry, George. Forever Ealing. Pavilion Books, 1994.
 Wood, Linda. British Films, 1927-1939. British Film Institute, 1986.

External links
 

1939 films
1930s thriller films
British thriller films
Films directed by Walter Forde
Films produced by Michael Balcon
Ealing Studios films
Films set in London
Films set in England
Films based on British novels
Films based on works by Edgar Wallace
British black-and-white films
1930s English-language films
1930s British films